RFA Sir Bedivere (L3004) was a Landing Ship Logistic of the Round Table class. She saw service in the Falklands War, the Persian Gulf and Sierra Leone. In 2009, she was commissioned into the Brazilian Navy and renamed NDCC Almirante Saboia (G-25), where she saw service in Haiti.

Background
The ship was originally built for army service, and was taken over by the Royal Fleet Auxiliary in 1970. Round Table class ships were exclusively manned by Hong Kong Chinese sailors from their introduction in 1963 until 1989, when Sir Lancelot was the last RFA to be crewed in this way.

She was commissioned in 1967 and saw extensive service in many of Britain's naval operations since. Her home port was Marchwood, Hampshire, which is a major military port.

Operational history

Falklands War
Sir Bedivere first saw combat in the Falklands War of 1982, when along with all of the Royal Navy's other amphibious ships, she was sent to recapture the Falkland Islands from an Argentine occupation force. At the start of the war, the ship was at Vancouver, British Columbia, Canada, but started back to Marchwood immediately. After loading at Marchwood, she left for Ascension Island where she picked up the sappers of 11 Field Squadron Royal Engineers. The ship suffered slight damage on 24 May whilst lying in San Carlos Water, when an Argentine Skyhawk dropped a bomb that glanced off the ship. The sappers disembarked for Port San Carlos on the evening of 25 May.

On 16 November 1982, she returned from the Falklands with the bodies of 64 members of the British Forces (52 soldiers, 11 Royal Marines, and a Chinese laundryman) whose families had wanted their remains returned.

1983-2007
The ship deployed to the Persian Gulf in 1991 in support of Operation Granby.

In 1994, the ship was modernised in a service life extension programme to give it an extra 15 years. The ship was lengthened by 12 metres, had its superstructure altered to a more modern design, the engines were replaced, and the ship's bow thrusters were changed for more powerful models.

After returning to service in 1998, the ship was sent to Sierra Leone in 2000 when the U.K. intervened there. The ship operated as the command vessel for British and American mine countermeasures ships during Operation Telic in 2003.

Sir Bedivere left the U.K. in September 2002 for the Mediterranean and operation Argonaut in 2002.She was then diverted to the Persian Gulf accompanied by four British minesweepers. After minesweeping operations were complete, the vessel operated as a troop support ship for the Royal Marines. The ship returned to the U.K. on 29 May 2003, carrying the boats and men of 539 Assault Squadron Royal Marines.

In 2006, Sir Bedivere returned from Sierra Leone and its part in Operation Vela.

Decommissioning
Although originally intended to be used until 2011, Sir Bedivere was decommissioned on 18 February 2008.

Brazilian Navy
In December 2008, Sir Bedivere was sold to Brazil, joining her sister ship . Sir Bedivere was handed over to the Brazilian Navy on 21 May 2009, after a major refit by A&P Group at the Company's ship repair facility in Falmouth, Cornwall. She was commissioned into service with the Brazilian Navy, and renamed Navio de Desembarque de Carros de Combate (Landing Ship, Tank) NDCC Almirante Saboia (G-25), after Almirante de esquadra Henrique Sabóia, minister of the Navy from 1985 to 1990 under the José Sarney administration. Admiral Saboia's widow and other members of the family were present at the handover ceremony.

As Almirante Saboia, she would undertake several voyages between Port-au-Prince and Rio de Janeiro in support of Brazilian Army and Marine Corps troops in United Nations service during MINUSTAH. In 12 January 2010, she joined the task force that would take part in the Brazilian Navy's ASPIRANTEX yearly training exercise, which included the frigates Niterói, Constituição and Independência, the tanker Almirante Gastão Motta, as well as the submarines Tupi and Tikuna, sailing under the command of Contra-Almirante César Sidonio Daiha Moreira de Souza. During the course of ASPIRANTEX 2010, Almirante Saboia would visit the ports of Salvador, Recife, Cabedelo and Natal. However, she would be requisitioned after the earthquake, leaving Rio de Janeiro on the 1st of February with 700 tons of supplies, including both humanitarian aid as well as military supplies for the Brazilian MINUSTAH contingent. She arrived on the 17th of February, spending the next 30 days in the Caribbean country. 

She would later take part in the Haiti XIV comission between the 21st of May and the 2nd of August 2012, carrying 260 tons of Marine Corps and Army supplies to MINUSTAH, and returning to Rio with roughly 300 tons of damaged vehicles and equipment for maintenance.

Gallery

References

External links

 

Bedivere (L3004)
Round Table-class landing ships logistics of the Brazilian Navy
1966 ships
Amphibious warfare vessels of Brazil
Amphibious warfare vessels of the Brazilian Navy
Falklands War naval ships of the United Kingdom
Ships built on the River Tyne